Morganton Downtown Historic District is a national historic district located at Morganton, Burke County, North Carolina.  It encompasses 62 contributing buildings in the central business district of Morganton. It includes commercial, industrial, and governmental buildings built between about 1889 and 1940. It includes representative examples of Classical Revival, Art Deco, and Italianate style architecture. Notable buildings include the Old Burke County Courthouse, Morganton Post Office, and the Morganton Community House.

It was listed on the National Register of Historic Places in 1987.

References

Historic districts on the National Register of Historic Places in North Carolina
Neoclassical architecture in North Carolina
Art Deco architecture in North Carolina
Italianate architecture in North Carolina
Historic districts in Burke County, North Carolina
National Register of Historic Places in Burke County, North Carolina